Pycnoderes is a genus of plant bugs in the family Miridae. There are more than 50 described species in Pycnoderes.

Species
These 56 species belong to the genus Pycnoderes:

 Pycnoderes albicornis Reuter, 1905
 Pycnoderes albipes (Berg, 1892)
 Pycnoderes amapaensis Carvalho, 1985
 Pycnoderes angustatus Reuter, 1907
 Pycnoderes antioquiensis Carvalho, 1988
 Pycnoderes ararensis Carvalho, 1988
 Pycnoderes atratus (Distant, 1884)
 Pycnoderes balli Knight, 1926
 Pycnoderes brasiliensis Carvalho & Gomes, 1971
 Pycnoderes cataguasensis Carvalho, 1988
 Pycnoderes centralis Carvalho, 1990
 Pycnoderes chanchamayanus Carvalho, 1991
 Pycnoderes chimborazensis Carvalho, 1985
 Pycnoderes chinchinaensis Carvalho, 1988
 Pycnoderes columbiensis Carvalho, 1985
 Pycnoderes convexicollis Blatchley, 1926
 Pycnoderes cuneomaculatus Carvalho, 1985
 Pycnoderes dilatatus Reuter, 1909
 Pycnoderes drakei Knight, 1926
 Pycnoderes ecuadorensis Carvalho & Gomes, 1971
 Pycnoderes emboliatus Carvalho, 1985
 Pycnoderes explanatus Carvalho & Rosas, 1962
 Pycnoderes gabrieli Carvalho, 1988
 Pycnoderes gibbus (Distant, 1884)
 Pycnoderes grandis Carvalho, 1985
 Pycnoderes guaranianus Carvalho & Gomes, 1971
 Pycnoderes heidemanni Reuter, 1912
 Pycnoderes iguazuensis Carvalho & Carpintero, 1986
 Pycnoderes impavidus (Distant, 1893)
 Pycnoderes incurvus (Distant, 1884)
 Pycnoderes infuscatus Knight, 1926
 Pycnoderes itatiaiensis Carvalho, 1980
 Pycnoderes jamaicensis Carvalho, 1985
 Pycnoderes leucopus (Stål, 1860)
 Pycnoderes lojaensis Carvalho, 1988
 Pycnoderes manabiensis Carvalho, 1985
 Pycnoderes martiniquensis Carvalho, 1988
 Pycnoderes medius Knight, 1926
 Pycnoderes misionensis Carvalho & Carpintero, 1990
 Pycnoderes monticulifer Reuter, 1908
 Pycnoderes nicaraguensis Carvalho, 1987
 Pycnoderes obliquatus Reuter, 1908
 Pycnoderes obscuratus Knight, 1926
 Pycnoderes oranensis Carvalho & Carpintero, 1990
 Pycnoderes pallidirostris (Stål, 1862)
 Pycnoderes palustris Carvalho, 1951
 Pycnoderes peruanus Carvalho, 1991
 Pycnoderes pucalensis Carvalho, 1988
 Pycnoderes quadrimaculatus Guérin-Méneville, 1857 (bean capsid)
 Pycnoderes similaris Hernandez & Henry, 2010
 Pycnoderes simoni (Reuter, 1892)
 Pycnoderes sixeonotoides Carvalho & Hussey, 1954
 Pycnoderes tobagoensis Carvalho, 1985
 Pycnoderes vanduzeei Reuter, 1907
 Pycnoderes venezuelanus Carvalho, 1985
 Pycnoderes venustus (Stål, 1860)

References

Further reading

External links

 

Miridae genera
Articles created by Qbugbot
Eccritotarsini